The 2001 Sydney to Hobart Yacht Race, was the 57th annual running of the "blue water classic" Sydney to Hobart Yacht Race. As in past editions of the race, it was hosted by the Cruising Yacht Club of Australia based in Sydney, New South Wales. No sponsor was selected for this year. As with previous Sydney to Hobart Yacht Races, the 2001 edition began on Sydney Harbour, at noon on Boxing Day (26 December 2001), before heading south for 630 nautical miles (1,170 km) through the Tasman Sea, past Bass Strait, into Storm Bay and up the River Derwent, to cross the finish line in Hobart, Tasmania. 

The 2001 Race was also part of Leg 3 of the 2001–02 Volvo Ocean Race which started in Sydney and finished in Auckland. The 2001 fleet comprised 75 starters of which 57 completed the race and 18 yachts retired.

Results

Line Honours results (Top 10)

Handicap results (Top 10)

References

Sydney to Hobart Yacht Race
S
2001 in Australian sport
December 2001 sports events in Australia